Thomas Hyunsu Edman (born May 9, 1995) is an American professional baseball shortstop and second baseman for the St. Louis Cardinals of Major League Baseball (MLB).

Born in Pontiac, Michigan, and raised in San Diego, Edman played college baseball at Stanford University for three seasons before being selected by the Cardinals in the sixth round of the 2016 Major League Baseball draft. He played in their minor league system before making his MLB debut in 2019 and quickly becoming a part of their starting lineup, playing various infield and outfield positions. He won a Gold Glove Award as the National League's top defensive second baseman in 2021.

Amateur career
Edman graduated from La Jolla Country Day School in San Diego, California, in 2013, where he was selected to an All-Academic Team. He attended Stanford University, where he played college baseball for the Stanford Cardinal. After his freshman year, he played in the New England Collegiate League for the Newport Gulls, where he was named an All-Star and was named best defensive player.
After his sophomore season in 2015, he played collegiate summer baseball for the Yarmouth–Dennis Red Sox of the Cape Cod Baseball League, where he batted .304, was named starting second baseman for the East Division All-Star team, and helped lead the Red Sox to the league championship. As a junior in 2016, Edman started every game at shortstop and batted .286 with 24 RBIs and led Stanford in runs (35), hits (61), triples (4) and stolen bases (8) in 54 games, earning a spot on the Pac-12 Conference first team. After his junior year, he was drafted by the St. Louis Cardinals in the sixth round of the 2016 Major League Baseball draft.

Professional career

Minor league career 

Edman signed with the Cardinals and was assigned to the State College Spikes, where he spent the whole season, posting a .286 batting average with four home runs, 33 RBIs and 19 stolen bases in 22 attempts over 66 games. He was named a New York-Penn League All-Star with the Spikes. In 2017, he played for the Peoria Chiefs, Palm Beach Cardinals, and Springfield Cardinals, batting a combined .261 with five home runs and 55 RBIs in 119 total games between the three clubs.

Edman began the 2018 season with Springfield, where he was named a Texas League All-Star. During the season, he reached base in 32 straight games, breaking Springfield's all-time record. He was promoted to the Memphis Redbirds at the end of the season, helping them win the Pacific Coast League title. He was named a co-MVP of the PCL playoffs, along with teammate Randy Arozarena. In 126 games between Springfield and Memphis, Edman slashed .301/.354/.402 with seven home runs, 41 RBIs, and 30 stolen bases in 35 attempts. After the season, the Cardinals assigned Edman to the Surprise Saguaros of the Arizona Fall League (AFL).

St. Louis Cardinals

2019

Edman began the 2019 season back with Memphis, batting .305/.356/.513 with seven home runs, 29 RBIs, and nine stolen bases over 49 games. On June 8, his contract was selected and he was called up to the major leagues for the first time. He made his debut that night as a pinch hitter versus the Chicago Cubs at Wrigley Field. He hit his first career home run on June 20 against the Marlins. On July 18, he hit his first career grand slam off of Robert Stephenson of the Cincinnati Reds at Great American Ball Park. Over 92 regular-season games with St. Louis in 2019, Edman slashed .304/.350/.500 with 11 home runs, 36 RBIs, and 15 stolen bases in 16 attempts. He had the fastest sprint speed of all major league third basemen at 29.4 feet/second.

2020
Edman was named to the roster to begin the summer camp in 2020 to prepare for the upcoming shortened season, and shortly after was announced as the starting third baseman. Over 204 at-bats, he batted .250/.317/.368 with five home runs and 26 RBIs.

2021
In 2021, Edman was named the club's starting second baseman after the departure of Kolten Wong and the acquisition of Nolan Arenado. He earned the Major League Baseball Player of the Week Award for the National League after batting .426 with two home runs from August 23 through August 29. Edman appeared in 159 games for the 2021 season, slashing .262/.308/.387 with 11 home runs, 56 RBIs, 41 doubles, and thirty stolen bases over 641 at-bats. His 41 doubles tied with Ozzie Albies for second in the National League, after Bryce Harper's 42. He won the Gold Glove Award at second base, one of five Cardinals to win the award that year, an MLB record.

2022
Edman returned as the Cardinals' starting second baseman to open the 2022 season. In mid-May, after the demotion of starting shortstop Paul DeJong and the call-up of top second base prospect Nolan Gorman, Edman moved to shortstop.  On June 11, 2022, Edman hit his first career walk-off home run and RBI, a two-run home run that secured a 5–4 victory versus the Cincinnati Reds. He finished the 2022 season slashing .265/.324/.400 with 13 home runs, 57 RBIs, 31 doubles, and 32 stolen bases over 577 at-bats in 153 games.

2023
On January 13, 2023, Edman agreed to a one-year, $4.2 million contract with the Cardinals, avoiding salary arbitration.

International Career

In 2023, Edman was called to the South Korea national baseball team. He is expected to play in 2023 World Baseball Classic as an infielder.

Personal life
Edman is the son of John Edman, Jr. and Maureen Kwak. He has Korean heritage from his mother’s side. His father John played four years of college baseball at Williams College in Massachusetts, and is a teacher and varsity baseball coach at La Jolla Country Day School, Edman's alma mater. His mother Maureen was born in South Korea and moved to the United States as a child. Edman's older brother, John, works in research and development for the Minnesota Twins. His younger sister, Elise, played volleyball at Davidson College and worked as a Systems Engineer for the Cardinals.

On November 23, 2019, Edman and his fiancée, Kristen, were married. The couple had originally planned the wedding for October 5, but were forced to reschedule due to the Cardinals' participation in the 2019 National League Division Series.

Edman is a Christian. Edman has said “Obviously, as a baseball player, your goal is to win the World Series. But I think for me, my goal is to be able to use the platform that I have to impact as many people as I can. It’s important for me as a Christian to be able to spread the word of God as much as I can.”

References

External links

Stanford Cardinal bio

1995 births
Living people
American baseball players of Korean descent
Baseball players from San Diego
Major League Baseball infielders
St. Louis Cardinals players
Gold Glove Award winners
Stanford Cardinal baseball players
State College Spikes players
Peoria Chiefs players
Palm Beach Cardinals players
Springfield Cardinals players
Memphis Redbirds players
Surprise Saguaros players
Yarmouth–Dennis Red Sox players
2023 World Baseball Classic players